Bob Eaton (born 21 April 1952) is a Canadian diver. He competed in the men's 10 metre platform event at the 1968 Summer Olympics.

References

External links

1952 births
Living people
Canadian male divers
Divers from Toronto
Olympic divers of Canada
Divers at the 1968 Summer Olympics
Commonwealth Games competitors for Canada
Divers at the 1970 British Commonwealth Games
Pan American Games competitors for Canada
Divers at the 1967 Pan American Games
Divers at the 1971 Pan American Games